Charlotte Ross (born January 21, 1968) is an American actress. She is best known for her roles as Eve Donovan on the NBC soap opera Days of Our Lives from 1987 to 1991, and as Det. Connie McDowell on the ABC police procedural drama series NYPD Blue from 2001 to 2004.

Early life
Ross was born in the Chicago suburb of Winnetka, Illinois, on January 21, 1968, and grew up there. Her parents are Debbie Ross Kullby, and Peter Ross (died 2009), who was a financial advisor. She has one sibling, a younger brother named George. Her first on-screen performance was in My First Mouthpiece when she was eight years old. She moved on to performing in various theater productions around metropolitan Chicago.

Career
After graduating from New Trier High School, Ross moved to Los Angeles, which her father opposed. She auditioned for the role of Kelly Bundy in the Fox comedy series Married... with Children, but was the producers' second choice behind Christina Applegate to whom she lost the role, before being cast as Eve Donovan on Days of Our Lives. Four years later, Ross co-starred with Katey Sagal in the television film Violation of Trust (aka She Says She's Innocent). The year after that, she guest starred on Married... with Children as one of Bud Bundy's sexier classmates.

Ross's run on Days of Our Lives lasted from 1987 to 1991, earning her two Emmy Award nominations. Her other television credits include the musical drama series The Heights (where she sang on the Billboard Number One hit "How Do You Talk to an Angel"), The 5 Mrs. Buchanans, Drexell's Class, Pauly, Law & Order, Trinity, Beggars and Choosers, Frasier, Savage Land, Jake in Progress, Fall Into Darkness, and A Kiss So Deadly (which reunited with her Days co-star Charles Shaughnessy). She also co-starred in the Lifetime original films Montana Sky and Christmas in Paradise (both 2007). She earned a Gold record in 1992 for her work as a singer on the soundtrack album to The Heights.

Ross also played Connie McDowell in the ABC police procedural drama series NYPD Blue from 2001 to 2004. On February 25, 2003, Ross appeared in an NYPD Blue episode entitled "Nude Awakening", which featured shots of her buttocks as she prepared to step into the shower. As a result, the FCC fined each of the 52 ABC stations with a $27,500 fine (a combined $1,430,000) for broadcasting "indecent material" between 6:00 a.m. and 10:00 p.m. However, on January 4, 2011, the U.S. Second Circuit Court of Appeals unanimously revoked the fine, stating that the FCC's enforcement of its indecency rules was "unconstitutionally vague and chilling." ABC, Inc., et al. v. Federal Communications Commission, No. 08-0841-ag(L) (2nd Cir.).

In 2006, Ross joined Billy Blanks to co-host a series of Tae-Bo infomercials. In 2011, Ross appeared as Candy in Summit's 3D film Drive Angry, alongside Nicolas Cage and Amber Heard. From 2009 to 2012, Ross began a recurring role on the Fox comedy-drama series Glee as Judy Fabray, the mother of Quinn Fabray (Dianna Agron). She appeared in four episodes. In 2013, Ross began starring in the VH1 sports drama series Hit the Floor. In 2014, Ross passed on an offer to return to Days of Our Lives as Eve Donovan, and her role was recast with Kassie DePaiva because she was too busy with other acting projects. Ross made a guest appearance in the ABC musical drama series Nashville. Later in the same year, she was cast as Felicity Smoak's mother in The CW superhero series, Arrow.

Personal life
On October 18, 2003, Ross married Michael Goldman and gave birth to a son, Maxwell Ross Goldman. She and Goldman separated in 2008. She resides in Los Angeles.

Activism
In 2002, Ross supported PETA's anti-fur campaign by appearing naked in advertisements captioned "I'd Rather Show My Buns Than Wear Fur".

In 2014, Ross signaled her support to the Animal Legal Defense Fund campaign "National Justice for Animals Week" by filming a video.

Filmography

Film

Television

References

External links

 
 
 Charlotte Ross as Olivia Vincent on VH1's Hit the Floor

1968 births
Living people
Actresses from Illinois
American soap opera actresses
American television actresses
New Trier High School alumni
People from Winnetka, Illinois
20th-century American actresses
21st-century American actresses